Anthony Lee Semple (born December 20, 1970) is a former professional American football guard who played eight seasons in the National Football League (NFL) for the Detroit Lions.

He was the offensive line coach at Hope College in 2016 & 2017.

References

External links
 Hope Bio

1970 births
Living people
American football offensive guards
Detroit Lions players
Hope Flying Dutchmen football coaches
Memphis Tigers football players
Sportspeople from Springfield, Illinois